John Lesko (born September 21, 1988 in Richland, Washington) is a former American soccer player.

Career

Youth and Amateur
Lesko attended Richland High School, and played college soccer at USC Aiken, where he was named to the 2009 Daktronics NCAA Division II Southeast Region Men's Soccer Second Team, and the Peach Belt Conference All-Conference team. He finished his college career with 4 goals in 50 appearances for the Pacers. 

During his college years Lesko also played with the Panama City Pirates in the USL Premier Development League.

Professional
Lesko signed his first professional contract in 2010 when he was signed by AC St. Louis of the USSF Division 2 Professional League. He made his professional debut on April 10, 2010 in St. Louis's first ever game, against Carolina RailHawks.

References

External links
 AC St. Louis bio
 USC Aiken profile

1988 births
Living people
American soccer players
Panama City Beach Pirates players
AC St. Louis players
People from Richland, Washington
USL League Two players
USSF Division 2 Professional League players
Soccer players from Washington (state)
Association football defenders
USC Aiken Pacers men's soccer players